Felix D'Souza (born 25 March 1980) is an Indian football player who played for Salgaocar in the I-League in India as a goalkeeper. He is also the reserve goalkeeper of India and lives in Goa. He coaches a Goan team called Yawe FC.

Honours

India
SAFF Championship: 2005

References

External links
 Goal.com profile

1980 births
Living people
Footballers from Goa
Indian footballers
India international footballers
Association football goalkeepers
I-League players
Churchill Brothers FC Goa players
Sporting Clube de Goa players
Salgaocar FC players